Berens is a German and Dutch surname.

Geographical distribution
As of 2014, 42.0% of all known bearers of the surname Berens were residents of the United States (frequency 1:81,381), 41.8% of Germany (1:18,151), 6.7% of the Netherlands (1:23,777), 2.1% of Canada (1:162,823) and 1.2% of England (1:427,690).

In Germany, the frequency of the surname was higher than the national average (1:18,151) in the following states:
 1. Rhineland-Palatinate (1:3,859)
 2. Saarland (1:8,989)
 3. North Rhine-Westphalia (1:9,775)
 4. Lower Saxony (1:10,756)
 5. Bremen (1:17,339)

In the Netherlands, the frequency of the surname was higher than the national average (1:23,777) in the following provinces:
 1. Drenthe (1:3,609)
 2. North Brabant (1:12,627)
 3. Gelderland (1:16,375)

In the United States, the frequency of the surname was higher than the national average (1:81,381) in the following states:
 1. South Dakota (1:5,591)
 2. Minnesota (1:16,742)
 3. Michigan (1:18,839)
 4. Kansas (1:19,642)
 5. Wisconsin (1:21,487)
 6. Nebraska (1:24,255)
 7. Colorado (1:24,930)
 8. Wyoming (1:28,652)
 9. Iowa (1:33,323)
 10. Montana (1:45,306)
 11. Illinois (1:48,348)
 12. Ohio (1:53,388)
 13. North Dakota (1:57,528)
 14. Arizona (1:61,234)
 15. Alaska (1:62,578)
 16. Washington (1:75,796)

People
Charlie Berens, American comedian
Chris Berens (born 1976), Dutch painter
Fritz Berens, conductor of the Sacramento Symphony
Harold Berens (1903–1995), British comedian and character actor
Henry Hulse Berens, governor of the Hudson's Bay Company (1858–1863)
Fort Berens, a short-lived fur trade post of the Hudson's Bay Company in the Fraser Canyon region of British Columbia, Canada
Hermann Berens (1826–1880), German composer
Lewis Henry Berens (died 1913), businessman and political theorist in South Australia
Mikhail Berens (1879–1943), brother of Yevgeny Berens, admiral in the Imperial Russian Navy and the White Navy during the Russian Civil War
Ricky Berens (b. 1988), swimmer and Olympic gold medallist for the United States
Yevgeny Berens (1876–1928), brother of Mikhail Berens, Commander-in-Chief of Soviet Naval Forces in 1919–1920

References

German-language surnames
Dutch-language surnames